Harry Van Mulligen (born April 2, 1947) is a Canadian retired provincial politician. He was a Saskatchewan New Democratic Party member of the Legislative Assembly of Saskatchewan from 1986 to 2009, when he resigned from the legislature to permit newly elected leader Dwain Lingenfelter to run in a by-election.

References

1947 births
Living people
People from Westerveld
Dutch emigrants to Canada
Saskatchewan New Democratic Party MLAs
Politicians from Regina, Saskatchewan
21st-century Canadian politicians
Finance ministers of Saskatchewan
Members of the Executive Council of Saskatchewan